Ramler is a surname of German origin. Notable people with the surname include:

Karl Wilhelm Ramler (1725–1798), German poet
Lexy Ramler (born 1999), American artistic gymnast
Saly Ruth Ramler (1894–1993), Czech mathematician

References

Surnames of German origin